Josie Rebecca Davis (born January 16, 1973) is an American actress, screenwriter and producer, best known for her role as Sarah Powell in the television sitcom Charles in Charge from 1987 to 1990.

Career

Television work
Born January 16, 1973 in California, Davis began her acting career at the age of three years. After nine years of acting, she received her first role on television as the character Sarah Powell on the sitcom Charles in Charge for 104 episodes across four seasons. Sarah Powell was a quiet, bookish character, and after Charles in Charge wrapped, Davis had a difficult time shedding that image and getting people to forget the character she created and to see her as outgoing.

Beginning as a teenager, Davis studied acting with the Brooklyn-born Paul E. Richards—Lee Strasberg's "right-hand man" at the Actors Studio in the 1950s. At 24, she auditioned and became a member of Actors Studio. At the time, the judges were Martin Landau, Mark Rydell, and Shelley Winters. Josie was one of only two performers selected to join that year.

In 1998, Davis was cast as Camille Desmond on the drama Beverly Hills, 90210 for a total of 11 episodes. In 2000, She then was cast in the other Aaron Spelling show, Titans opposite Victoria Principal and Yasmine Bleeth.

Her other television credits include working opposite Clifton Collins Jr. on Fear Itself, with David Spade on Rules of Engagement, with James Woods on Shark, Ghost Whisperer, a Christmas episode of Two and a Half Men, NCIS, CSI: Miami, Burn Notice, Chuck, Bones, and a recurring role opposite Skeet Ulrich and Gary Sinise on CSI: NY.

Film work
After Titans came to an end, Davis left TV to pursue film work. She acted in films, including the Nicolas Cage-directed Sonny, opposite James Franco and Scott Caan, The Trouble with Romance with Kip Pardue, and Kalamazoo? with Mayim Bialik, among other indies.

She was also the lead actress in the television movie The Perfect Assistant, which premiered on Lifetime on January 2, 2008.

She also did thrillers The Perfect Student with Natasha Henstridge, Seduced by Lies with Lochlyn Munro and Marc Menard, Past Obsession with Lochlyn Munro and comedy Stealing Roses with John Heard and Cindy Williams. 
Davis not only is an actress, but has ventured into producing and is also a screenwriter.

Filmography

Film

Television

Notes

References

External links
Official website

American child actresses
American television actresses
American film actresses
American soap opera actresses
Actresses from Los Angeles
Living people
21st-century American women
1973 births